Feanwâlden is a railway station located in Feanwâlden, Netherlands. The station was opened on 1 June 1866 and is located on the Harlingen–Nieuweschans railway between Leeuwarden and Groningen. Train services are operated by Arriva.

The station was called Veenwouden (the Dutch name for the village) until 12 December 2015 when it was renamed Feanwâlden. This is to reflect the Frisian name of the town, which was changed in 2009.

Train services

Bus services

See also
 List of railway stations in Friesland

External links
NS website 
Dutch Public Transport journey planner 

Railway stations in Friesland
Railway stations opened in 1866
Railway stations on the Staatslijn B
1866 establishments in the Netherlands
Railway stations in the Netherlands opened in the 19th century